Jack Thomas Smith (May 24, 1924 - October 17, 2001) was an American stock car racer. He raced in the first NASCAR race, in 1949, and is a member of the NMPA Hall of Fame in Darlington, South Carolina.

Biography
Smith was born in Metropolis, Illinois and then moved to Georgia when he was two years old, settling in Roswell, Georgia. Jack got his start in the automotive industry by working in his father shop at a young age. Jack worked at a service station in the 1940's near Roswell. He began racing against local bootleggers on rough dirt tracks and asphalt superspeedways, and across fields. He began racing in 1947 after building a car.

He made his debut in NASCAR's first race, in 1949 at the Charlotte Speedway, and finished 13th. At the 1958 Southern 500 at Darlington, Jack trailed a car blowing up and getting caught in the oil, his car started tumble, flipping his car five times and rolling into the parking lot, after a doctor checked him out, he came out un-injured and drove home that night. He won the NASCAR's Most Popular Driver Award in 1959; although he tied Junior Johnson in the initial voting, a second ballot was opened that Smith won. Jack was known in his early days to run mainly Pontiac's. As a result during a time when teams started to get a stranglehold in the sport, engineer Ray Nichols approached Jack to run his car in select races in 1960.

In the 1960's, he and team owner Bud Moore became the first to communicate in a race via two-way radio. Smith was known for his racing superstitions of no green cars among other things. After his racing career ended, he focused on his transmission business, He died from congestive heart failure on October 17, 2001.

Motorsports career results

NASCAR
(key) (Bold – Pole position awarded by qualifying time. Italics – Pole position earned by points standings or practice time. * – Most laps led. ** – All laps led.)

Grand National Series

Daytona 500

Convertible Division

References

External links
 

1924 births
2001 deaths
NASCAR drivers
People from Metropolis, Illinois
Racing drivers from Atlanta
Racing drivers from Georgia (U.S. state)
Racing drivers from Illinois